Zbych Trofimiuk (born 7 April 1979) is an Australian language teacher, academic, and actor. He is known for his award-winning performance as Mike Masters in the children's television adventure series Sky Trackers, and as the lead character Paul Reynolds in the children's science fiction series Spellbinder.

Personal life
Born in Prague in the Czech Republic in 1979, to Prague-born sculptor Zoja Trofimiuk and Jurek Trofimiuk, the languages of his early years were Czech, Polish, and German. At four years old, he emigrated with his parents to Melbourne Australia, where he began to learn English.

In 2004, he graduated from Melbourne's Victoria University with a B.A. in Performance Studies.

Career

Television 
Trofimiuk is known for his work as a child actor in Australian television productions.

In 1990, he appeared in ABC's Choices, a short series of mini-dramas about peer pressure and the choices individual children have to make. 

In 1994, he appeared in an episode of Network 10's short-lived continuation of the popular Australian soap opera, A Country Practice. 

In 1995, Trofimiuk starred in leading roles in two drama series for children: first in the educational adventure series Sky Trackers, playing Mike Masters, for which he won the Australian Film Institute's Young Actor Award; and second as the protagonist, Paul Reynolds, in the science fiction series Spellbinder. Both Sky Trackers and Spellbinder won the Australian Film Institute's Award for Best Children's Television Drama (in 1994 and 1996 respectively). Also in 1995, Trofimiuk guested in an episode of the second series of Snowy River - The McGregor Saga.

Theatre
In 2005, Trofimiuk performed in the play "Bunny", written and directed by Benjamin Cittadini, at the La Mama Theatre in Melbourne, Australia.

In 2007, he co-directed La Mama's production "Elmo" with its playwright Cittadini. The play was a follow-up to "Bunny," and the second play in the author's "Trilogy of Love Stories."

Film
Trofimiuk played the role of Kane in the 2006 independent film Clean.

Teaching and research
Since 2006, Trofimiuk has taught English as a foreign language, as a teacher in Australia's English Language Intensive Courses for Overseas Students (ELICOS) scheme; and he is an educational researcher at Melbourne's Monash University, in the Digital Education Research Group.

Awards
Australian Film Institute's Young Actor Award, for Sky Trackers, 1994
Premier's VCE Award, 1996

Filmography
Choices, 1990
A Country Practice, 1994. (Episode 14.14, "Tuesday's Child")
Sky Trackers, 1994 (completed), 1995 (broadcast)
Snowy River: The McGregor Saga, 1995. (Episode 2.4, "Fathers and Sons")
Spellbinder, 1995
Clean, 2006

References

External links

1979 births
Living people
Australian male television actors
Czechoslovak emigrants to Australia
Victoria University, Melbourne alumni